Lucas 'Masterpieces' Moripe is a South African former soccer player.

Career

Moripe began his career in 1971 playing with Pretoria Callies in the NPSL. He was awarded the Player of the Year and Sportsman of the Year title in 1973, and played for a short while with Caroline Hill FC in Hong Kong.

Described as "probably the greatest ball player the country has known" and nicknamed "the god of football" by fans, Moripe was unable to play at a higher level due to the sports boycott of the apartheid government. Moripe joined Orlando Pirates in 1981, although by then he was already suffering from the effects of a persistent knee injury, and retired shortly after.

Honours

A street in Atteridgeville was named after him, and in 2010, the Atteridgeville Super Stadium was renamed in his honour, to the Lucas Masterpieces Moripe Stadium.

Personal
Moripe had a child with Virginia Mbatha, an Atteridgeville singer. They parted when the child, William Mbatha, was seven. William, nicknamed "King of Bling", is a suspected crime lord and convicted criminal, and Moripe said that he "failed as a father to look after William and guide him as a parent".

Moripe suffered a mild stroke and currently uses crutches as a result of his knee injury. He still attends matches at his namesake stadium.

References

Living people
Orlando Pirates F.C. players
Sportspeople from Soweto
South African expatriate soccer players
South African soccer players
Association footballers not categorized by position
Year of birth missing (living people)
Pretoria Callies F.C. players